Cemal Kafadar (born 1954) is Professor of History and the Vehbi Koç Professor of Turkish Studies in the Harvard University Department of History. He is an honorary member of the Turkish Historical Society.

Kafadar graduated from Robert College, then Hamilton College, and received his PhD from the McGill University Institute of Islamic Studies in 1987 and taught for two years in Princeton's Near Eastern Studies department before going to Harvard. Kafadar teaches seminars related to popular culture, hagiography and Ottoman historiography as well as the early modern history of the Middle East and Balkans. He is a member of the editorial board of the Historians of the Ottoman Empire and was a member of the jury of the Antalya Golden Orange Film Festival in 2009.

He is the author of the book Between Two Worlds: The Construction of the Ottoman State (1995).

Selected publications

Gülru Necipoğlu, Cemal Kafadar, and Cornell Fleischer, eds. (2019). Treasures of Knowledge. An Inventory of the Ottoman Palace Library (1502/3-1503/4). 2 vols. Leiden: Brill.

References

1954 births
20th-century Turkish historians
21st-century Turkish historians
Harvard University faculty
Scholars of Ottoman history
Living people
McGill University Institute of Islamic Studies alumni
Robert College alumni